Paul Robinson (born 5 January 1963) is an English former professional footballer who played in the Football League as a left back. His career was cut short after sustaining a broken leg in a pre-season match in a tackle by Colchester's Roger Osbourne, scorer of the FA Cup final winning goal for Ipswich in 1978.

References

Sources
Paul Robinson, Neil Brown
Paul Robinson breaks leg in pre-season match

1963 births
Living people
English footballers
Association football defenders
Footballers from Hampstead
Millwall F.C. players
English Football League players